Jesse Crenshaw (born September 23, 1946) is an American politician who served as a member of the Kentucky House of Representatives for the 77th district from 1993 to 2015.

Education
Crenshaw earned a Bachelor of Science degree from Kentucky State University and a Juris Doctor from the University of Kentucky College of Law.

Elections
1992: Crenshaw was initially elected in the 1992 Democratic primary and the November 3, 1992 general election.
1994: Crenshaw was unopposed for both the 1994 Democratic primary and the November 8, 1994 general election.
1996: Crenshaw was unopposed for both the 1996 Democratic primary and the November 5, 1996 general election.
1998: Crenshaw was unopposed for both the 1998 Democratic primary and the November 3, 1998 general election.
2000: Crenshaw was unopposed for both the 2000 Democratic primary and the November 7, 2000 general election, winning with 6,363 votes.
2002: Crenshaw was unopposed for both the 2002 Democratic primary and the November 5, 2002 general election, winning with 4,589 votes.
2004: Crenshaw was unopposed for both the 2004 Democratic primary and the November 2, 2004 general election, winning with 10,252 votes.
2006: Crenshaw was unopposed for the 2006 Democratic primary and won the November 7, 2006 general election with 6,231 votes (100%) against Republican nominee Stephen McFayden.
2008: Crenshaw was unopposed for both the 2008 Democratic primary and the November 4, 2008 general election, winning with 12,873 votes.
2010: Crenshaw was challenged in the May 18, 2010 Democratic primary, winning with 4,532 votes (82.0%) and won the November 2, 2010 general election with 7,131 votes (70.6%) against Republican nominee David Darnell.
2012: Crenshaw was unopposed for both the May 22, 2012 Democratic primary and was unopposed for the November 6, 2012 general election, winning with 12,822 votes.

References

External links
Official page  at the Kentucky general Assembly

Jesse Crenshaw at Ballotpedia
Jesse Crenshaw at OpenSecrets

Place of birth missing (living people)
1946 births
Living people
African-American state legislators in Kentucky
Kentucky lawyers
Kentucky State University alumni
Democratic Party members of the Kentucky House of Representatives
Politicians from Lexington, Kentucky
University of Kentucky College of Law alumni
21st-century African-American people
20th-century African-American people